Katharine Marjory Stewart-Murray, Duchess of Atholl, DBE (née Ramsay; 6 November 1874 – 21 October 1960), known as the Marchioness of Tullibardine from 1899 to 1917, was a British noblewoman and Scottish Unionist Party politician whose views were often unpopular in her party.

Early life and education
Katharine Marjory Ramsay was born in Edinburgh on 6 November 1874, the daughter of Sir James Henry Ramsay, 10th Baronet and Charlotte Fanning Ramsay (née Stewart). She was educated at Wimbledon High School and the Royal College of Music. During her school years she was known as Kitty Ramsay. On 20 July 1899, she married John Stewart-Murray, Marquess of Tullibardine, who succeeded his father as 8th Duke of Atholl in 1917, whereupon she became formally styled Duchess of Atholl.

Political career
Known as "Kitty", Stewart-Murray was active in Scottish social service and local government and in 1912 served on the hugely influential "Highlands and Islands Medical Service Committee" (authors of the Dewar Report) that has been widely credited with creating the forerunner of the National Health Service. She was the chairman of the Consultative Council on Highlands and Islands

As the Marchioness of Tullibardine she was an opponent of female suffrage, with Leah Leneman describing her as 'a key speaker at the most important Scottish anti-suffrage demonstration', which took place in 1912. In 1913 she became vice-president of the branch of the Anti-Suffrage League based in Dundee. Despite this opposition to women gaining the right to vote in parliamentary elections, she went on to be the Scottish Unionist Member of Parliament (MP) for Kinross and West Perthshire from 1923 to 1938, and served as Parliamentary Secretary to the Board of Education from 1924 to 1929, the first woman other than a mistress of the robes to serve in a British Conservative government. She was the first woman elected to represent a Scottish seat at Westminster.

The historian William Knox has argued that, like other early female MPs in the UK, "she literally inherited" her seat from her husband, but Kenneth Baxter disputes this, noting that her husband had stood down from the former West Perthshire seat in 1917 when he succeeded to the dukedom and that it had been won by a Liberal candidate in 1918 and 1922. Moreover, Baxter claims her victory in 1923 was not seen as "a foregone conclusion". The fact that, prior to 1918, Atholl had been opposed to women's suffrage led to her being criticised in parliament by her Conservative colleague Nancy Astor.

She resigned the Conservative Whip first in 1935 over the India Bill and the "national-socialist tendency" of the government's domestic policy. Resuming the Whip, she resigned it again in 1938 in opposition to Neville Chamberlain's policy of appeasement of Adolf Hitler and to the Anglo-Italian agreement. According to her biography, A Working Partnership she was then deselected by her local party. She took Stewardship of the Chiltern Hundreds on 28 November 1938. She stood unsuccessfully in the subsequent by-election as an Independent candidate.

She argued that she actively opposed totalitarian regimes and practices. In 1931, she published The Conscription of a People—a protest against the abuse of human rights in the Soviet Union. After reading the German edition of Mein Kampf she also condemned Nazi Germany. In 1936, she was involved in a long-running battle in the pages of various newspapers with Lady Houston after the latter had become notorious for her outspoken support of Benito Mussolini. Stewart-Murray had taken issue with Houston calling in the pages of the Saturday Review on the king to become British dictator in imitation of the European interwar dictatorships.

According to her autobiography Working Partnership (1958), it was at the prompting of Ellen Wilkinson that in April 1937 she, Eleanor Rathbone, and Wilkinson went to Spain to observe the effects of the Spanish Civil War. In Valencia, Barcelona and Madrid she saw the impact of Luftwaffe bombing on behalf of the Nationalists, visited prisoners of war held by the Republicans and considered the impact of the conflict on women and children, in particular. Her book Searchlight on Spain resulted from the involvement, and her support for the Republican side in the conflict led to her being nicknamed by some the Red Duchess. Her role in the Spanish Civil War, however, was years later criticized by George Orwell, who saw the Duchess as the "pet of the Daily Worker", and someone who "lent the considerable weight of her authority to every lie the Communists happened to be uttering at the moment. Now she is fighting against the monster that she helped create. I am sure that neither she nor her Communist ex-friends see any moral in this."

Shortly before or even during 1938, she travelled to Romania where she visited "Satu Mare Romanian Women Association" in the city of Satu Mare, aiming to support the Romanian cause to preserve the state borders established in 1918, and to keep Hungary from regaining the territory that it lost in the Treaty of Trianon.

She campaigned against the Soviet control of Poland, Czechoslovakia and Hungary as the chairman of the League for European Freedom in Britain from 1945. In 1958, she published a description of her life with her husband entitled Working Partnership.

Other work
She was also a vice-president of the Girls' Public Day School Trust from 1924 to 1960. She was also a keen composer, setting music to accompany the poetry of Robert Louis Stevenson. In 1927 she opened the new wing at Clifton High School, Bristol with the head Ms Glenday and the architect Sir George Oatley

She was closely involved in her husband's regiment The Scottish Horse and composed the melody "The Scottish Horse" to be played on bagpipes.

Honours
She was appointed Dame Commander of the Order of the British Empire (DBE) in the 1918 Birthday Honours.

As Dowager Duchess of Atholl she took over the appointment of Honorary Colonel of The Regiment of Scottish Horse from 1942, until she relinquished it in 1952.

Death
Katharine, Duchess of Atholl, died in Edinburgh, aged 85, in 1960.

Publications
  (2 Volumes)
 
 
 Atholl, Katharine Marjory Stewart-Murray, Duchess of (1933) Main Facts of the Indian Problem.
  1st, 2nd & 3rd editions

See also
 Duke of Atholl
 Julia Pirie

References

Sources

Primary sources
Records relating to Atholl can be found at:
 British Library Manuscript Section – correspondence with Lord Cecil, 1936–1944, Ref Add MS 51142 ( web site)
 Churchill Archives, Cambridge University – correspondence with Sir E L Spears, Ref SPRS (on-line catalogue).
 British Library, Asia, Pacific and Africa Collections – correspondence and papers relating to Indian self-government, 1928–1935. Ref:MSS Eur 903 (web site)
  National Library of Scotland, Manuscripts Collections, correspondence and papers regarding the Scottish National War Memorial, 1919–1958, Ref: Acc 4714. (web site).
  King's College London Liddell Hart Centre for Military Archives. Ref: LIDDELL: 1/27 (on-line catalogue).
 Institute of Education Archives, Girls' Day School Trust collection 'Katherine, Duchess of Atholl', 1960. Ref: GDS/2/3/1 (on-line catalogue).
Source:

Published sources

External links 
 
 
 Documents on the duchess's role in the Spanish Civil War from "Trabajadores: The Spanish Civil War through the eyes of organised labour", a digitised collection of more than 13,000 pages of documents from the archives of the British Trades Union Congress held in the Modern Records Centre, University of Warwick
 
 
 

1874 births
1960 deaths
Politicians from Edinburgh
Alumni of the Royal College of Music
British anti-communists
British anti-fascists
British duchesses by marriage
Katharine
Dames Commander of the Order of the British Empire
Daughters of baronets
Female members of the Parliament of the United Kingdom for Scottish constituencies
Members of the Parliament of the United Kingdom for Scottish constituencies
People educated at Wimbledon High School
Presidents of the Girls' Day School Trust
Scottish Horse officers
Scottish anti-communists
Unionist Party (Scotland) MPs
UK MPs 1923–1924
UK MPs 1924–1929
UK MPs 1929–1931
UK MPs 1931–1935
UK MPs 1935–1945
20th-century Scottish women politicians
20th-century Scottish politicians
Spouses of British politicians